Takkari Donga is a 2002 Indian Telugu-language revisionist western film produced, written, and directed by Jayant Paranjee. The film starred Mahesh Babu, Lisa Ray, Bipasha Basu, and Rahul Dev in pivotal roles. Shot entirely in the United States, upon release, Takkari Donga received mixed reviews, having won five state Nandi Awards including Best Audiography, Best Cinematography, and Best Action. The film had an Average run at the box office. The film was dubbed into Hindi as Choron Ka Chor by Goldmines Telefilms in 2014 and into Tamil as Vetri Veeran. and it was dubbed in Bhojpuri as Choron Ka Raja.

Plot
The film starts with the slain bandit Shaka killing his own elder brother for information related to diamond valley, who is also known to rancher Veeru Dada. In the encounter, Veeru jumps off into a river from a cliff. After 18 years in Gajner, Rajasthan, we have Veeru with an amputated leg, giving info to Raja, a mischievous, and tough outlaw who loots banks in style. Raja gives Veeru a share of 50% for all his tip-offs. Raja becomes more daring as the price tag on his head increases by thousands.  There is another mischievous thief, Panasa. She and her uncle follow Raja so she can dupe him and escape with all the looted money. As things go on a frolicking way between Panasa and Raja, Shaka is searching for Veeru. Veeru realizes Shaka will kill him soon. 

Hence, Veeru offers a large diamond to Raja and asks him to take his daughter Bhuvana to his brother Dharma's place via a dangerous route. Enroute, there are some romantic encounters, and they fall in love. Raja sees a house that emotionally disturbs him. When Bhuvana asks about it he reveals that it is his childhood house and his father and sister were killed by an unknown masked person and he became a thief on the journey of finding him. When Bhuvana asks how will he identify the killer, he tells her there is a scar on the killer's hand by which he can identify him.

Later, when they go to Dharma's place, Dharma is killed. Raja goes to a nearby shop to arrange a funeral for Dharma. But it is Shaka who is disguised as the shop owner. When Shaka arrives he sees a map in Bhuvana's hand. He forcibly tries to take it and in excitement he said that for that map he killed his brother, Bhuvana's father, Dharma and that map is the way to diamond valley. Meanwhile, a fight ensues in which the map is burnt. Then Shaka ties Raja to a tree and forcibly takes Bhuvana as only she knows the route to that hidden diamond treasury.

Meanwhile, Raja releases himself and went to Shaka. A fight takes place. Later, Shaka reveals he knows who killed Raja's father and he will give details about him only when Raja helps him cross the dangerous terrain to reach diamond valley with hidden treasure. Raja agrees. With the help of Raja, Shaka finds the path to the hidden treasure. While Shaka is taking the diamonds, Raja notices the scar on Shaka's hand by which he realizes it is Shaka who killed his father and sister. t the climax, Raja kills Shaka and reunites with Bhuvana.

Cast
 Mahesh Babu as Raja
 Lisa Ray as  Bhuvana
 Bipasha Basu as Panasa
 Kolla Ashok Kumar as Veeru Dada
 Rahul Dev as Shaka
 Tanikella Bharani as Doobey (Panasa's uncle)
 Rajasimha as Bartender
 Ravi Chalapati
 Krishna (special appearance)

Production
90% of the film's shoot was done in Colorado.

Soundtrack
The soundtrack was composed by Mani Sharma and the lyrics were written by Bhuvana Chandra, Vennelakanti, Chandra Bose and Kula Sekhar.
 Theme - Instrumental
 "Nalugurikee" - Shankar Mahadevan, Lyrics by Chandrabose 
 "Aleba Aleba" - K. K, Kalpana, Lyrics by Bhuvana Chandra
 "Hey Mama" - Tippu, Kalpana, Lyrics by Vennalakanti
 "Bagundammo" - SPB Charan, Usha, Lyrics by Kula Sekhar
 "Chukkallu Chandhrudee" - S. P. Balasubrahmanyam, Prasanna, Lyrics by Bhuvana Chandra

Reception 
A critic from Deccan Chronicle wrote that "A smooth, technically brilliant movie after a considerable time in Telugu, Takari Donga is entertaining and, in spite of its stereotypical pitfalls, is certainly a refreshing break from the deluge of routine love stories". A critic from The Hindu said that "Though it is not new for the Telugu film makers to make cowboy films, this film scores in technical quality, with cinematographer Jayanan Vincent leading in his department. The visual is set against a kind of dusty hue throughout its run, reflecting the wild West". A critic from The Times of India stated that "If you don't mind half a dozen songs slackening the pace of the film Takkari Donga is a complete entertainer".

Awards
Nandi Awards
 Best Audiographer - P. Madhusudhan Reddy 
 Special Jury Award - Mahesh Babu
 Best Fight Master - Vijayan
 Best Cinematographer - Jayanan Vincent
 Best Child Actor - Koushik Babu

References

External links
 

2000s Telugu-language films
2002 films
Indian action comedy films
Indian Western (genre) comedy films
2000s Western (genre) comedy films
2002 action comedy films
Films shot in New Mexico
Films shot in San Francisco
Films shot in Texas
Films shot in Utah
Films set in Rajasthan
Films shot in Rajasthan
Treasure hunt films
Films scored by Mani Sharma
Films shot in Colorado
Films shot in the United States
Films directed by Jayanth C. Paranjee